Eleonora Alvisi and Lisa Pigato were the defending champions, but they lost in the semifinals to Alex Eala and Oksana Selekhmeteva.

Eala and Selekhmeteva went on to win the title, defeating Maria Bondarenko and Amarissa Kiara Tóth in the final, 6–0, 7–5.

Seeds

Draw

Finals

Top half

Bottom half

References

External links 
Draw at rolandgarros.com
Draw at rolandgarros.com
Draw at ITFtennis.com

Girls' Doubles
French Open by year – Girls' doubles